Himarë (Greek: Χειμάρρα, romanized: Himárra) is a bilingual town in Southern Albania along the Albanian Riviera and part of the Vlorë County. It is the largest settlement and the seat of the municipality of Himarë. Both the town and municipality are populated predominantly by an ethnic Greek community.

History
In antiquity the region was inhabited by the Greek tribe of the Chaonians. The town of Himarë is believed to have been founded as Χίμαιρα, (Chimaira or Chimaera, hence the name Himara) by the Chaonians as a trading outpost on the Chaonian shore. However, another theory according to the name suggest that comes from Greek χείμαρρος (cheimarros), meaning "torrent".

The town is noted among ancient writers, including Pliny the Elder and Procopius.

The town of Himara during the 16th-18th centuries was ecclesiastically under the jurisdiction of Rome, and some of its inhabitants were Catholics of the Eastern rite.

Notable people
 Christos Bekas, Greek Army general in the Greek War of Independence (1821–1830).
 Vasil Bollano, former mayor of Himarë and President of the organization of the Greek minority, "Omonoia".
 Pyrros Dimas, Greek weight-lifting athlete
 Christos Armandos Gezos, novelist and poet
 Kostas Kaznezis, Greek Army general in the Greek War of Independence.
 Zachos Milios (1805–1860), Greek Army officer and revolutionary
 Sotiris Ninis, Greek footballer
 Spyromilios (1800–1880), Greek Army general and politician
 Spyros Spyromilios (1864–1930), Greek Gendarmerie officer, declared the region's autonomy (1914)
 Pyrros Spyromilios (1913–1961), Greek Navy officer
 Neço Muko  (1899-1934), Traditional Albanian music Singer and Composer

See also
Himara
Greeks in Albania
Tourism in Albania

References

External links

Populated places in Himara
Seaside resorts in Albania
Greek communities in Albania
Labëria